Ioana Ducu and Ioana Loredana Roșca were the defending champions, but were not eligible to participate this year.

Miriam Kolodziejová and Markéta Vondroušová won the title, defeating Caroline Dolehide and Katerina Stewart in the final, 6–0, 6–3.

Seeds

Draw

Finals

Top half

Bottom half

External links 
 Draw

Girls' Doubles
French Open, 2015 Girls' Doubles